Acrobacias del corazón (English language: Acrobatics of the Heart) is a 2000 Argentine romantic drama film directed, written by and starring María Teresa Constantini. Gabriel Goity and Virginia Innocenti also star.

Release and acclaim
The film premiered on 13 April 2000 in Buenos Aires. It was produced by Buenos Aires Producciones S.A. and distributed by the company although Argentina Video Home are acclaimed for its VHS and DVD release.

Cast
 María Teresa Constantini as Marisa
 Virginia Innocenti as Lola
 Gabriel Goity as Jorge
 Cecilia Dopazo as Lucía
 Alejandro Awada as Rafael
 Antonio Grimau as Emilio
 Silvia Baylé as María
 Pablo Ini
 Silvana Sosto

External links
 

2000 films
2000s Spanish-language films
2000 romantic drama films
Argentine romantic drama films
2000s Argentine films